Solanum lucani is a species of flowering plant in the family Solanaceae, native to seasonally dry areas of northern Australia. It is a sprawling annual that does well in disturbed areas.

References

lucani
Endemic flora of Australia
Flora of Western Australia
Flora of the Northern Territory
Flora of Queensland
Taxa named by Ferdinand von Mueller
Plants described in 1893